Gabriel Soares (born 22 January 1997, in Brazil) is an Italian rower.

Soares is an athlete of the Gruppo Sportivo della Marina Militare.

Biography
His club is Marina militare Sabaudia. He has represented Italy since 2015 in a variety of boat sizes.

He started competing in 2010 with the club U.S. Bellagina, with Enrico Mooney. Then he moved to  Gruppo sportivo of MM Sabaudia, with Franco Sancassani.

In 2015, he participated in the Italian team that won, without him, the silver medal at the European in Račice.

He was in the winning Men’s lightweight quadruple sculls team at the European Championships in 2019 and 2020 and won the Men’s lightweight single sculls at the European Championship in 2021

Palmarès
European Rowing Championships
Lucerne 2019: Gold medal, LM4x.
2019 World Rowing Championships : silver medal LM4x.

References

External links

1997 births
Living people
Italian male rowers
World Rowing Championships medalists for Italy
Rowers of Marina Militare
20th-century Italian people
21st-century Italian people